Montcalm Township is a civil township of Montcalm County in the U.S. state of Michigan. The population was 3,178 at the 2000 census.

Communities
The Gowen post office, with ZIP code 49326, serves areas in the northwestern area of Montcalm Township, as well as a small area in southern Pine Township and a large portion of eastern Spencer Township and a small area in northeast Oakfield Township in Kent County. Gowen began circa 1847 as a lumbering center and was first known as Gregor's Mills, and later as Kaywood. Colonel James Gowen, from Lancaster County, Pennsylvania, founded the present community and platted it in 1871. A post office was established on March 4, 1872, with Samuel N. Peck as the first postmaster. It was a station on the Detroit, Grand Rapids and Western Railroad.
 The city of Greenville is to the south, and the Greenville post office, with ZIP code 48838, also serves a large portion of Montcalm Township.
 The city of Stanton is to the northeast, and the Stanton post office, with ZIP code 48888, also serves an area in northeast Montcalm Township.
 The village of Sheridan is to the east, and the Sheridan post office, with ZIP code 48884, also serves a small area in eastern Montcalm Township.
 The community of Sidney is to the east in Sidney Township, and the Sidney post office, with ZIP code 48885, also serves an area in eastern Montcalm Township.

Geography

Demographics
As of the census of 2000, there were 3,178 people, 1,154 households, and 887 families residing in the township. The racial makeup of the township was 98.24% White, 0.13% African American, 0.60% Native American, 0.09% Asian, 0.03% Pacific Islander, 0.28% from other races, and 0.63% from two or more races. Hispanic or Latino of any race were 1.26% of the population.

There were 1,154 households, out of which 36.6% had children under the age of 18 living with them, 62.6% were married couples living together, 9.4% had a female householder with no husband present, and 23.1% were non-families. 17.7% of all households were made up of individuals, and 5.9% had someone living alone who was 65 years of age or older.  The average household size was 2.75 and the average family size was 3.08.

In the township the population was spread out, with 28.0% under the age of 18, 7.8% from 18 to 24, 30.4% from 25 to 44, 23.3% from 45 to 64, and 10.5% who were 65 years of age or older.  The median age was 36 years. For every 100 females, there were 102.7 males.  For every 100 females age 18 and over, there were 102.5 males.

The median income for a household in the township was $43,485, and the median income for a family was $50,558. Males had a median income of $35,389 versus $25,068 for females. The per capita income for the township was $17,591.  About 3.4% of families and 7.4% of the population were below the poverty line, including 8.2% of those under age 18 and 4.5% of those age 65 or over.

References

Townships in Montcalm County, Michigan
Townships in Michigan